The spot-throated hummingbird (Thaumasius taczanowskii) is a species of hummingbird in the "emeralds", tribe Trochilini of subfamily Trochilinae. It is endemic to Peru but there are uncorroborated sightings in Ecuador.

Taxonomy and systematics

The spot-throated hummingbird was formerly placed in the genus Leucippus. A molecular phylogenetic study published in 2014 found that Leucippus was polyphyletic. To resolve the polyphyly the spot-throated hummingbird and the Tumbes hummingbird (Thaumasius baeri) were moved by most taxonomic systems to the resurrected genus Thaumasius. However, BirdLife International's Handbook of the Birds of the World retains it in Leucippus.

The spot-throated hummingbird is monotypic.

Description

The sexes are essentially alike. They have a somewhat decurved black bill, though sometimes the mandible is gray-brown or even yellow with a black tip. Their upperparts are grayish green to bronze green with a bronze crown and uppertail coverts. Their inner tail feathers are grayish green to bronze green that progresses to grayish on the outer ones, which also have a bronze band near the end. Their underparts are drab gray with golden green speckles on the chin, throat, and flanks. The undertail coverts have pale brown centers and whitish edges.

Distribution and habitat

The spot-throated hummingbird is generally considered to occur only in Peru, on the west slope of the Andes and the Marañon River valley from near the Ecuadorean border south to Ancash Department. Undocumented sight records in far southern Ecuador lead the South American Classification Committee of the American Ornithological Society to list it as hypothetical in that country. It inhabits arid scrublands and the edges of deciduous forest.

Behavior

Movement

The movements of the spot-throated hummingbird, if any, have not been documented.

Feeding

The spot-throated hummingbird forages for nectar from the understory to the mid-strata. Though details of the flowering plants it favors are lacking, it is known to feed at Inga trees, Agave, and banana (Musa). In addition to nectar, it feeds on small arthropods caught on the wing.

Breeding

The spot-throated hummingbird's breeding phenology and nest have not been described.

Vocalization

The spot-throated hummingbird's song is "a complex series of chips and wheezing electric warbles." It also makes "a dry chatter and tip notes."

Status

The IUCN has assessed the spot-throated hummingbird as being of Least Concern. It has a fairly large range but its population size and trend are unknown. No immediate threats have been identified. It is considered fairly common, and "[h]uman activity has little effect on Spot-throated Hummingbird, at least in the short term".

References

spot-throated hummingbird
Birds of the Peruvian Andes
Endemic birds of Peru
spot-throated hummingbird
spot-throated hummingbird
Taxonomy articles created by Polbot
Taxobox binomials not recognized by IUCN